Zhang Yingying (born 1983) is a female Chinese former international table tennis player.

She won a gold medal and bronze medal at the 1999 World Table Tennis Championships with partners Ma Lin and Zhang Yining, respectively.

See also
 List of table tennis players

References

Sportspeople from Nanjing
Table tennis players from Jiangsu
1983 births
Chinese female table tennis players
Living people
World Table Tennis Championships medalists